Nicolette Ella Fraillon  (born 29 July 1960) is an Australian conductor, who was chief conductor of The Australian Ballet from 2003 until 2022.

Career
Fraillon grew up in Melbourne, a child of immigrant parents of Huguenot-Sicilian and Austrian Jewish origins. Her family is musical: both grandfathers were cellists, and her brother Guillaume was principal bass player with the Melbourne Symphony Orchestra.

She started violin and piano studies as a child; her teachers included Brian Buggy (violin) and Ada Corder (piano). She played with the Victorian Youth Symphony Orchestra and the Melbourne Youth Orchestra for some time.

As an adult she studied viola under Chris Martin at the University of Melbourne. She studied conducting at the Hochschule für Musik in Vienna, Austria, from 1984, and later in Hanover, Germany. Her professional conducting debut was with the Nederlands Dans Theater, when she deputised for another conductor who had fallen ill. In the Netherlands, she also worked on a production of Les Misérables, both playing viola in the orchestra and working as second conductor. Later she was appointed music director and chief conductor of the Dutch National Ballet.

In the Netherlands she also met her fourth husband, Aernoot Kervert, an employee of the Hilversum Radio Philharmonic Orchestra. Her three earlier marriages ended in divorce. 

In 1995 she was engaged by the Tasmanian Symphony Orchestra, becoming the first Australian woman to conduct an Australian symphony orchestra. She later conducted the West Australian Symphony Orchestra.

In October 1997 Fraillon was appointed director of the Canberra School of Music, effective from June 1998. In 1998 she commenced at the Australian Opera and Ballet Orchestra. In 2003 she was appointed chief conductor of The Australian Ballet. She was their first woman conductor, and, in 2016, the world's only woman music director of a ballet company. In November 2021, Fraillon announced that she would leave that position in 2022.

Personal life 
Fraillon has two sons.

Fraillon has been married five times, most recently to First Nations soprano, Deborah Cheetham Fraillon. Cheetham and Fraillon married on 2 January 2023 at their home in Church Point, NSW.

References

1960 births
Living people
Australian conductors (music)
Women conductors (music)
Members of the Order of Australia
Australian people of Austrian-Jewish descent
Australian people of French descent
Australian people of Sicilian descent
21st-century conductors (music)
Musicians from Melbourne
Australian lesbian musicians